Pieter Dircksz Graeff (* 1574 in Amsterdam, † 27 July 1645 ibid) was a descendant of the Dutch regent family De Graeff. The Lord of Engelenburg was born as the third son of Dirk Jansz Graeff and Agniet Pietersdr van Neck.

Life 
Pieter Dircksz Graeff remained unmarried. In contrast to his Protestant family, he may was a follower of the catholic Religion. In Amsterdam he lived in a town house on the Fluweelenburgwal. In 1620 he bought the castle of Engelenburg (near Herwijnen at Gelderland) together with the associated manor from Jonker Willem Johansz van Gent. On December 30 of that year he was enfeoffed with this knightly court (Ridderhofstad) and seigniory. After his death, the husband of his niece Christina de Graeff (1609-1679), Jacob Bicker, was bequeathed the rights to the estate.

In 1613 he had made a journey to the Holy Land. In Jerusalem he received a document, which was prepared by the Franciscan monk Angelus a Messana, and which describes his visit to Christie's tomb. The document also includes the names of a number of the religious sites he visited there. Today the same is in the Amsterdam City Archives of the De Graeff family. He also traveled the historic caravan route from Jerusalem to Cairo with the Swiss Hans Jakob Ammann and two Italian travel companions. His burial place is in the Oude kerk. In his book Ammann named him "Edel und Vest Herr Peter Graffe" (noble and firm lord Peter Graffe).

Trivia 
 Pieter Dircksz Graeff (Pieter Dircksz de Graeff van Engelenburg) was mistakenly named as mayor of Amsterdam (as were other people in his family). He was not a member of the Vroedschap, the council or any other municipal government office.
 There is a painted portrait of Graeff with his coat of arms.

Notes

Literature 
 Ammann, Hans Jakob: "Hans Jakob Amman genannt der Thalwyler Schärer und seine Reise ins Gelobte Land". Zürich: Polygraph. Institut A. G. 1919 (Faksimile of the book from 1630)

Pieter Dircksz, Graeff
Nobility from Amsterdam
1574 births
1645 deaths